Mihai Stoica (born 12 April 1965), commonly known as Meme Stoica, is a former president of Oțelul Galați and former general manager of Unirea Urziceni. Since November 2010 until September 2011, Mihai Stoica was the manager of FCSB. He was for a while the permanent co-host of some TV shows at DigiSport TV Channel. In 2012, he returned to FCSB as manager.

In March 2014, he was convicted by a Romanian appeals court to a jail term of 3 years and 6 months for money laundering and tax evasion in connection with the transfer of 12 Romanian soccer players abroad.

Footballer
 Oțelul Galați (1986–1987)

External links
Official website

References

1965 births
Living people
Sportspeople from Sibiu
FC Steaua București presidents
Romanian sports executives and administrators
Romanian white-collar criminals